Gardan Kalat (also Romanized as Gardan Kalāt and Gardankalāt) is a village in Khafri Rural District, in the Central District of Sepidan County, Fars Province, Iran. At the 2006 census, its population was 132, in 32 families.

References 

Populated places in Sepidan County